Ijero Ekiti is a town in Ekiti State of Nigeria in West Africa.  Ijero Ekiti is situated in the northwest part of Ekiti State. Ijero Ekiti is the Local Government Headcount. The main language spoken by the indigenes of Ijero Ekiti is Ekiti dialect and the Yoruba language.

Ijero Ekiti is about Six (6) hours drive to Abuja, The Federal Capital Territory of Nigeria, also about five (5) hours drive to Lagos City Metropoly and about one hour (1) hour drive to Ado Ekiti, the Capital of Ekiti State.

Population and economy

With a population of 5,230 people as it was shown with the 2007 population census.  The Ijero people are agrarian society producing food crops such as yam, cocoyam, cassava, pepper, tomatoes, and banana. and all crops mentioned above are produced with good qualities.

Ijero Ekiti has the presence of both federal and state in the town such as schools (primary and secondary), Federal Road Safety Corps and Primary Health Care, etc.

Cultural attire
Ijero Ekiti is the home of culture and tradition of which our dressing has traditional value. Male dress in Buba and Sokoto with fitted cap while the female dress in Iro and Buba with Gele (head tie), the chief dresses in traditional attire and put on beads on their neck and wrist both male and female chief. chief Eyegun of Ijero Ekiti is the head of female in the kingdom.

The king always dress in big attire called Agbada with crown and beads on his neck and on his wrists. The queens (Olori) always dress decently with beads on their wrists and neck. They do not wear headgear instead beads are used to design headgear and this is what they wear on their head.

Religion
Before the introduction of foreign religion, Ifa, Osun, Imole, Orisa nla and Ogun are the gods which our fore fathers worships in those days.  Chief Esinkin and others are the custodian of cultural heritage in Ijero Ekiti. The chief mentioned are directly involved in the cultural festival activities which normally takes place in the Kingdom.

Ijero contains several churches including Seventh-Day Adventist Church, a Catholic church, Christ Church Cathedral, Christ Apostolic Church, Redeemed Christian Church of God and Winner's Chapel.

Further reading

Ijero Kingdom in Yoruba History by J. Wellington Alufa
Tell Ijeroism by Femi Alufa (2003)
Ajero Oyiyosoye and the Ekitiparapo War by Leke Oyebade

References

Towns in Yorubaland
Local Government Areas in Ekiti State